Max Becker may refer to:

 Max Becker, member of American punk rock band SWMRS
 Max Joseph Becker (1828–1896), German-born American civil engineer